Nirvana is a 2008 Russian drama film directed by Igor Voloshin.

Plot 
The film tells about a girl Alisa going to St. Petersburg. Her neighbor is a nightclub bartender, living with her boyfriend and not trusting anyone. And suddenly she is left alone and realizes that Alisa is the only person who can be trusted.

Cast 
 Olga Sutulova as Alisa
 Mariya Shalayeva
 Artur Smolyaninov as Valera
 Mikhail Evlanov
 Andrey Khabarov
 Tatyana Samoylova as Margarita Ivanovna
 Leonid Voron as Policeman

References

External links 
 

2008 films
2000s Russian-language films
Russian drama films
2008 drama films